Sumburgh Airport  is the main airport serving Shetland in Scotland. The airport is owned by Highlands and Islands Airports Limited (HIAL) and served by Loganair.

On 1 April 1995, ownership of the Company transferred from the UK Civil Aviation Authority to the Secretary of State for Scotland and subsequently to the Scottish Ministers. HIAL receives subsidies from the Scottish Ministers in accordance with Section 34 of the Civil Aviation Act 1982 and is sponsored by Transport Scotland which is an Executive Agency of the Scottish Government and accountable to Scottish Ministers.

History
Sumburgh Links was surveyed and the grass strips laid out by Captain E. E. Fresson of Highland Airways in 1936: the airport was opened on 3 June of that year with the inaugural flight from Aberdeen (Kintore) by the De Havilland Dragon Rapide G-ACPN piloted by Fresson himself. It was also one of the first airfields to have RDF facilities, due to the frequency of low cloud and fog and the proximity of Sumburgh Head. The runways were built at the instigation of Capt. Fresson, who had proved to the Navy at Hatston (Orkney) that to maintain all-round landing facilities over the winter months runways were essential. This was taken up by the RAF after the obvious success of the Hatston experiment.

The former RAF Sumburgh airfield had three runways, two of which, although extended, remain in use by the present airport. No. 404 Squadron operated Beaufighter Mark VI and X aircraft from this station on coastal raids against Axis shipping off the coast of Norway and in the North Sea. The airport is unusual in that it has a  helicopter runway as opposed to usual helipad. The western end of runway 09/27 crosses the A970 road between Sumburgh (including the airport) and the northern mainland; access is controlled by a level crossing with barriers closed whenever a flight is taking off or landing.

Airlines and destinations

Cargo

Other tenants
Maritime and Coastguard Agency (His Majesty's Coastguard)
Bristow Helicopters
Babcock Mission Critical Services Offshore (SAR and crew change operations)

Ground transport 
Bus service 6, operated by J&DS Halcrow of Cunningsburgh, provides a regular link between the airport and the town seven days per week. In the evening, the service is run by Yell-based operator, R. Robertson & Son.

Statistics

Incidents and accidents
10 January 1977: Hawker Siddeley 748 G-AZSU, operated by Dan-Air and flying an unscheduled service from Belfast-Aldergrove, failed to stop in the landing distance available and overshot the runway. The aircraft sustained minor damage when the nose-wheel undercarriage collapsed. There were no injuries.
31 July 1979: Crash of Dan-Air Flight 0034, a Hawker Siddeley 748 series 1 (registration G-BEKF) operating an oil industry support flight. The aircraft failed to become airborne and crashed into the sea. The accident was due to the elevator gust-lock having become re-engaged, preventing the aircraft from rotating into a flying attitude. The aircraft was destroyed and 17 people died.
29 March 1981: Potez 840 F-BMCY operated by Club Aéronautique de Paris made a wheels-up landing at Sumburgh. Damage was minimal and the aircraft was parked on a stand for many months. The four Astazou engines and other useful parts were removed and the airframe dragged off to a quiet corner of the airfield to be abandoned. When the runway was extended it was saved and now resides in a private garden in North Roe in the north of Shetland. Only 8 Potez 840s were built.
6 November 1986: British International Helicopters Chinook crash. Only two people survived with 45 lives being lost.
11 June 2006 Air Accidents Investigation Branch recommended a safety audit of City Star Airlines after a serious incident in which a Dornier 328 crew flew close to cliffs and failed to respond correctly to terrain warnings on approach to Sumburgh Airport after a flight from Aberdeen. The aircraft landed safely. The captain involved was suspended and asked to resign after an investigation.
The UK Air Accidents Investigation Branch identified the lack of effective monitoring of flight instruments as a cause of the crash. Four of those aboard were killed.
15 December 2014: Loganair Flight 6780 was a flight from Aberdeen to Shetland, which was struck by lightning during an attempt to land at Sumburgh Airport. The aircraft went in a steep dive before the pilots were able to recover. The flight diverted to Aberdeen.

References

External links

Sumburgh Airport - Official website
Illustrated entry in Shetlopedia
Photographs of aircraft at Sumburgh Airport
Information on World War II aircraft that crashed in and around Shetland

Airports in Shetland
Airports established in 1936
1936 establishments in Scotland
Highlands and Islands Airports
Mainland, Shetland